The Austin Area Terminal Railroad  was a short-line terminal railroad headquartered in Round Rock, Texas.

Overview
AUAR operated a  line from Llano, Texas, to an interchange with Union Pacific at Giddings, Texas, with a  branch from Fairland to Marble Falls.  The line, which was originally a Southern Pacific branch that had been operated by Longhorn Railway until AUAR assumed control, is owned by Capital Metropolitan Transportation Authority, with whom AUAR had a contract to operate the railroad from April 2000 to September 2007.  AUAR traffic included aggregates, crushed limestone, calcium bicarbonate, lumber, beer, chemicals, plastics, and paper.  

The contract was transferred to Watco as of October 1, 2007 and the name of the railroad was subsequently changed to the Austin Western Railroad.

In addition, the Austin Steam Train Association operated an excursion train between Austin, Cedar Park, and Burnet.

References

External links
Capital Metro carrying the freight
Austin Steam Train Association 

Defunct Texas railroads
Switching and terminal railroads
Railway companies established in 2000
Railway companies disestablished in 2007
2000 establishments in Texas
2007 disestablishments in Texas